Al-Kawkab Football Club is a Saudi Arabian professional football club based in Al Kharj, that plays in the Prince Mohammad bin Salman League, the second tier of Saudi football. It was founded in 1968.

Al-Kawkab have won Saudi First Division once and finished runners-up once. They have competed in the Saudi Professional League twice and have been relegated in each season. They won the Second Division once and finished runners-up once as well. The club last competed in the Professional League in the 1987–88 season when they were relegated back to the First Division.

The club play their home games at Al-Shoulla Club Stadium in Al Kharj, sharing the stadium with city rivals Al-Shoulla, with whom they contest the Al Kharj derby.

Honours
Saudi First Division
Winners (1): 1986–87
Runners-up (1): 1984–85
Saudi Second Division
Winners (3): 1978–79, 2004–05, 2016–17

Current squad

Managerial history

 Fahad Al-Yaeesh (1967 – 1971)
 Ibrahim El-Esawi (1975 – 1977)
 Mahmoud El-Sayes (1978 – 1979)
 Farouk El-Sayed (1979 – 1980)
 Mahmoud El-Sayes (1982 – 1983)
 Omar El Nahal (1983 – 1984)
 Mokhtar Tlili (1984 – 1985)
 Ger Blok (1985 – 1986)
 Nasser Al-Olaiwi (1986 – 1987)
 Nasser Al-Olaiwi (1990 – 1991)
 Farouk El-Sayed (1991 – 1992)
 Nasser Al-Olaiwi (1994 – 1995)
 Khaled Al-Jasser (1995 – 1996)
 Boualem Laroum (1996 – 1997)
 Altayeb Enani (1999 – 2000)
 Mahmoud Lajdidi (1999 – 2000)
 Saad Al-Subeai (2004 – 2005)
 Khaled Al-Farhan (2005)
 Sami Farhan (2005 – 2006)
 Khaled Al-Farhan (2006 – 2007)
 Mabrook Al-Kilani (2009 – 2010)
 Selim Al Manga (July 23, 2011 – April 12, 2012)
 Sultan Khamis (June 11, 2012 – October 4, 2013)
 Chaker Meftah (October 10, 2013 – January 19, 2014)
 Ibrahim Al-Mutaiwee (January 20, 2014 – February 15, 2014)
 Hassine Menestiri (February 15, 2014 – May 1, 2014)
 Moncef Mcharek (June 18, 2014 – September 27, 2018)
 Osama Nabieh (October 4, 2018 – April 3, 2019)
 Moncef Mcharek (April 5, 2019 – May 1, 2020)
 Jameel Qassem (June 15, 2020 – September 14, 2020)
 Kamel Zaiem (September 22, 2020 – December 8, 2020)
 Mohammed Aldo (December 9, 2020 – May 3, 2021)
 Ramzi Kerid (May 3, 2021 – May 31, 2021)
 Yamen Zelfani (June 26, 2021 – February 16, 2022)
 Juan José Maqueda (February 18, 2022 – April 2, 2022)
 Saber Abdellaoui (April 6, 2022 – May 16, 2022)
 Abdullah Al-Otaibi (caretaker) (May 16, 2022 – June 1, 2022)
 Yousri bin Kahla (August 16, 2022 – September 23, 2022)
 Ramzi Kerid (September 25, 2022 – December 22, 2022)
 Maher Guizani (December 22, 2022 – )

References

Football clubs in Saudi Arabia
Football clubs in Al-Kharj
Association football clubs established in 1968
1968 establishments in Saudi Arabia